Tangail Railway Station is a station situated at  north-west of Dhaka, the capital of Bangladesh. It is the principal station of the city of Tangail.

Trains

 Inter-city Trains
 Tangail Commuter 1(Dhaka-Bangabandhu Setu East-Dhaka)
 Tangail Commuter 2(Dhaka-Bangabandhu Setu East-Dhaka)
 Silk City Express(Dhaka- Rajshahi - Dhaka)
 Dhumketu Express (Dhaka- Rajshahi - Dhaka)
 Padma Express (Dhaka- Rajshahi - Dhaka)
 Drutajan Express (Dhaka- Dinajpur - Dhaka)
 Ekota Express (Dhaka- Dinajpur - Dhaka)
 Lalmoni Express (Dhaka- Lalmonirhat - Dhaka)
 Sirajganj Express (Dhaka- Ishwardi - Dhaka)
 Rangpur Express (Dhaka- Rangpur - Dhaka)
 Sundarban Express (Dhaka- Khulna - Dhaka)
 Chitra Express (Dhaka- Khulna - Dhaka)
 Nilsagor Express (Dhaka- Nilphamari - Dhaka)

 Mail Trains
 Rajshahi Mail (Dhaka- Chapai Nawabganj - Dhaka)

References

Railway stations in Dhaka Division
Railway stations opened in 1999
Tangail District
Tangail City
1999 establishments in Bangladesh